Sir Robert Andrews Mackenzie Douglas, 3rd Baronet (19 July 1837 – 28 February 1884) was a Member of Parliament for Marsden in Northland, New Zealand.

Biography

Douglas was born in 1837, the eldest son of Sir Robert Andrews Douglas, 2nd Baronet of Douglas of Glenbervie. His grandfather, the 1st Baronet, was Kenneth Douglas, born Kenneth MacKenzie. The 3rd Baronet was educated at first in Jersey and completed his studies in Hampshire. He was gazetted into the 57th Regiment in 1854 and very quickly was on active service in the Crimean War. He was present at the storming of Sebastopol, and the capture of Kinburn, receiving the Crimean medal and clasp, and the Turkish War medal. He next served against the Arabs at Aden, and was present at the capture at Sheikothman. He then took part in the suppression of the Indian mutiny. The 57th were afterwards dispatched to New Zealand, and Sir Robert was present at various skirmishes, and at Nukumaru, receiving the honour of mention in general orders. For ten years he commanded a company of the old 'Die Hards', and the retired by sale of commission, and settled in Whangarei.

On 31 March 1866, he married Eleanor Louisa Smith, the daughter of Thomas Huntley Liffiton. She had previously married Frederick Smith, a soldier serving with the 65th Regiment of Foot, at Wanganui in 1859, but was widowed in 1861.

From 1873 to the abolition in 1876, he was member of the Auckland Provincial Council for the Whangarei electorate. During his time in parliament, he was an active part of the opposition against the Grey Ministry. Douglas had cancer, and for the last few weeks of his life, he stayed with his brother-in-law, C. H. Ashford. He died on 28 February 1884, and his wife died in 1919.

Notes

References

Members of the New Zealand House of Representatives
1837 births
1884 deaths
New Zealand MPs for North Island electorates
Baronets in the Baronetage of the United Kingdom
57th Regiment of Foot officers
British Army personnel of the Crimean War
British military personnel of the Indian Rebellion of 1857
British military personnel of the New Zealand Wars
19th-century New Zealand politicians